This is a list of schools in Selangor, Malaysia. It is categorised according to the variants of schools in Malaysia and is arranged alphabetically.

Private schools

Chinese independent high schools 

 Chung Hua Independent High School
 Hin Hua High School
 Pin Hwa High School
 Kwang Hua Private High School

International/other private schools 

 Alice Smith School, Kuala Lumpur
 At-Tamimi International School Subang Jaya
 Australian International School Malaysia (AISM)
 Axcel International School, Batu 14
 Beaconhouse Sri Lethia, Klang
 Beaconhouse Sri Murni, Cheras
 Chinese Taipei School Kuala Lumpur
 Dwi Emas International School
 Eagles Grammar International School, USJ 12
 ELC International School (EIS)
 Fairview International School, Subang Jaya Campus (FISSJ)
 HELP International School
 IGB International School (IGBIS)
 Japanese School of Kuala Lumpur
 Kingsley International School
 Nobel International School, Selangor
 Regent International School, Klang
 Regent International School, Puchong
 Rocklin International School, Kuala Lumpur
 Sapura Smart School, Subang
 Sekolah Sri Acmar, Bandar Baru Klang
 Sekolah Sri Bestari, Bandar Sri Damansara
 Sri Bestari International School, Bandar Sri Damansara (SBIS)
 Sekolah Sri KDU®, Kota Damansara
 Sekolah Sri Sempurna
 Sri Emas International School
 Sri KDU® International School, Kota Damansara
 Sri Kuala Lumpur School, Subang Jaya
 Sri Sempurna International School
 Sri UCSI Secondary School, Subang Jaya
 Sunway International School (SIS)
 Taylor's International School, Kuala Lumpur (TISKL)
 Taylor's International School, Puchong (TISP)
 The International School at Parkcity
 UCSI International School, Subang Jaya
 Victoria International School (VIS), Banting
 Wesley Methodist School, Klang
 Wesley Methodist School Kuala Lumpur (International)

Primary schools

National primary schools 
 Sekolah Kebangsaan Desa Aman, Kuala Selangor
 Sekolah Kebangsaan Sungai Binjai, Meru
 Sekolah Kebangsaan Bukit Rimau

Chinese vernacular primary schools 

 Sekolah Jenis Kebangsaan (C) Chee Wen
 Sekolah Jenis Kebangsaan (C) Chen Moh, Petaling Jaya
 Sekolah Jenis Kebangsaan (C) Chong Hua, Klang
 Sekolah Jenis Kebangsaan (C) Choong Hua, Banting
 Sekolah Jenis Kebangsaan (C) Damansara
 Sekolah Jenis Kebangsaan (C) Desa Jaya 1
 Sekolah Jenis Kebangsaan (C) Desa Jaya 2
 Sekolah Jenis Kebangsaan (C) Han Ming
 Sekolah Jenis Kebangsaan (C) Hin Hua
 Sekolah Jenis Kebangsaan (C) Ijok
 Sekolah Jenis Kebangsaan (C) Jalan Davidson
 Sekolah Jenis Kebangsaan (C) Kah Wah, Banting
 Sekolah Jenis Kebangsaan (C) Kampung Baru Semenyih
 Sekolah Jenis Kebangsaan (C) Kepong 1
 Sekolah Jenis Kebangsaan (C) Kepong 2
 Sekolah Jenis Kebangsaan (C) Kepong 3
 Sekolah Jenis Kebangsaan (C) Khe Beng
 Sekolah Jenis Kebangsaan (C) Kian Sit
 Sekolah Jenis Kebangsaan (C) Kong Hoe, Klang
 Sekolah Jenis Kebangsaan (C) Kota Emerald
 Sekolah Jenis Kebangsaan (C) Kundang
 Sekolah Jenis Kebangsaan (C) Ladang Harcroft
 Sekolah Jenis Kebangsaan (C) Lick Hung
 Sekolah Jenis Kebangsaan (C) Lick Hung, SS19
 Sekolah Jenis Kebangsaan (C) Pandamaran A
 Sekolah Jenis Kebangsaan (C) Pandamaran B
 Sekolah Jenis Kebangsaan (C) Pin Hwa 1
Sekolah Jenis Kebangsaan (C) Pin Hwa 2
 Sekolah Jenis Kebangsaan (C) Puay Chai
 Sekolah Jenis Kebangsaan (C) Puay Chai 2
 Sekolah Jenis Kebangsaan (C) Pui Ying
 Sekolah Jenis Kebangsaan (C) San Yuk
 Sekolah Jenis Kebangsaan (C) Serdang Baru 1
 Sekolah Jenis Kebangsaan (C) Serdang Baru 2
 Sekolah Jenis Kebangsaan (C) Sin Ming, Semenyih
 Sekolah Jenis Kebangsaan (C) Subang
 Sekolah Jenis Kebangsaan (C) Sungai Buloh
 Sekolah Jenis Kebangsaan (C) Sungai Way
 Sekolah Jenis Kebangsaan (C) Taman Rashna
 Sekolah Jenis Kebangsaan (C) Tiong Nam, Sungai Buaya
 Sekolah Jenis Kebangsaan (C) Tun Tan Cheng Lock
 Sekolah Jenis Kebangsaan (C) Tun Tan Siew Sin, Putra Heights
 Sekolah Jenis Kebangsaan (C) Wu Teck
 Sekolah Jenis Kebangsaan (C) Yak Chee
 Sekolah Jenis Kebangsaan (C) Yoke Kuan
 Sekolah Jenis Kebangsaan (C) Yu Hua
 Sekolah Jenis Kebangsaan (C) Yuk Chai
 Sekolah Jenis Kebangsaan (C) Yuk Chih, Bestari Jaya
 Sekolah Jenis Kebangsaan (C) Yuk Chyun, Petaling Jaya

Secondary schools

Secondary education: Sekolah Menengah Kebangsaan (SMK)

Boarding schools and Islamic colleges

 Kolej Islam Sultan Alam Shah (KISAS), Klang
 Maktab Rendah Sains MARA, Kuala Kubu Bharu
 Sekolah Agama Menengah Bestari (SAMBEST), Subang Jaya
 Sekolah Agama Menengah Hulu Langat, Batu 10 Cheras (SAMTEN)
 Sekolah Agama Menengah Nurul Iman Kg Bukit Cherakah (SAMNI)
 Sekolah Agama Menengah Rawang (SAMER)
 Sekolah Agama Menengah Sultan Hisamuddin, Sungai Bertih, Klang
 Sekolah Agama Menengah Tinggi Sultan Hisamuddin, Klang (SAMTSH)
 Sekolah Agama Menengah Tinggi Tengku Ampuan Jemaah, Shah Alam (SAMTTAJ)
Sekolah Agama Menengah Tinggi Tengku Ampuan Rahimah, Sungai Manggis, Banting (SAMTTAR)
 Sekolah Menengah Islam Hira', Jeram
Sekolah Berasrama Penuh Integrasi Gombak (INTEGOMB)
Sekolah Berasrama Penuh Integrasi Rawang (SEPINTAR)

 Sekolah Berasrama Penuh Integrasi Sabak Bernam (INTESABER), Sabak Bernam
 Sekolah Menengah Sains Banting (BASIS), Banting
 Sekolah Menengah Sains Hulu Selangor (SEMASHUR)
 Sekolah Menengah Sains Kuala Selangor (KUSESS)

Selangor